The 2017 Boca Raton Bowl was a college football bowl game played on December 19, 2017, at FAU Stadium in Boca Raton, Florida, United States.  The fourth edition of the Boca Raton Bowl featured the Conference USA champion Florida Atlantic Owls against the Mid-American Conference East Division champion Akron Zips.  Kickoff was scheduled for 7:00 PM EST and the game aired on ESPN.  It was one of the 2017–18 bowl games that concluded the 2017 FBS football season.  Sponsored by the Cheribundi beverage company, the game was officially known as the Cheribundi Tart Cherry Boca Raton Bowl.

Teams
The game featured the Akron Zips against the Florida Atlantic Owls and was the first-ever meeting between the two schools.

Akron Zips

Florida Atlantic Owls

This was Florida Atlantic's third bowl game in school history, first since 2008, and first Boca Raton Bowl; the Owls won both of their previous bowl games (the 2007 New Orleans Bowl and the 2008 Motor City Bowl).

This was Akron's third bowl game in school history, first since 2015, and first Boca Raton Bowl; the Zips previously lost one bowl game (the 2005 Motor City Bowl) and won one bowl game (the 2015 Famous Idaho Potato Bowl).

Game summary

Scoring summary

Statistics

References

External links
 Box score at ESPN

Boca Raton Bowl
Boca Raton Bowl
Akron Zips football bowl games
Florida Atlantic Owls football bowl games
Boca Raton Bowl
Boca Raton Bowl